Wolfgang Danne (9 December 1941 – 16 June 2019) was a West German pair skater. He was born in Hildesheim. With partner Margot Glockshuber, he became the 1968 Olympic bronze medalist. They were also the 1967 World and 1967 European silver medalists.

Results

With Margot Glockshuber

With Sigrid Riechmann

References

External links 
 Database Olympics
 Skatabase: 1960s Worlds
 Skatabase: 1960s Europeans

German male pair skaters
Figure skaters at the 1968 Winter Olympics
Olympic figure skaters of West Germany
Olympic bronze medalists for West Germany
1941 births
2019 deaths
Olympic medalists in figure skating
World Figure Skating Championships medalists
European Figure Skating Championships medalists
Medalists at the 1968 Winter Olympics
Sportspeople from Hildesheim